The Coventry Theatre was a 2,000-seat theatre located on Hales Street in Coventry, England. It opened in 1937 as the New Hippodrome and was renamed the Coventry Theatre in 1955. In 1979 it was purchased by businessman Paul Gregg and became the Coventry Apollo. It closed in 1985 with a performance by Barbara Dickson. In its later years the building became a bingo club before being demolished in 2002.

Alan Melville's comedy Castle in the Air premiered at the theatre in 1949 before transferring to the West End.

References

Theatres in Coventry
Demolished buildings and structures in England
Buildings and structures demolished in 2002